Union of Italian Migrant Workers, was an organization of Italian immigrants in West Germany. FILE had political affiliations to the PC(m-l)I. It also maintained relations with the refounded KPD and the Communist League of West Germany (Kommunistischer Bund Westdeutschland; KBW). West German state security estimated the membership of FILE to be 1200 people. FILE was dissolved in 1974.

Political organisations based in Germany
Defunct communist parties in Italy
Politics of Italy
Foreign workers
Italian expatriates in Germany